Gabriel Nicholas Wilkins (born January 9, 1971) is a former American Football defensive end who played for the Green Bay Packers and the San Francisco 49ers in a six-year career that lasted from 1994 to 1999 in the National Football League.

Early life
He attended Gettys D. Broome High School.

Collegiate career
Attending NAIA Gardner–Webb University, Wilkins recorded 29 sacks and 53 tackles for loss (both school records), and participated in the 1992 NAIA Football Championship game.

Professional career

Green Bay Packers
Wilkins was selected by the Green Bay Packers in the 1994 NFL Draft (4th round, 126th overall). After being used sparingly in his first three seasons, Wilkins performed well in relief of Reggie White during Super Bowl XXXI, recording a tackle and a deflected pass. Becoming a starter after Sean Jones retired in 1997, Wilkins finished the season with 50 tackles, 5.5 sacks, a 77-yard interception return touchdown, and a fumble recovery touchdown. However, Wilkins played only one drive of Super Bowl XXXII due to a knee injury.

San Francisco 49ers
Following the 1997 season, the San Francisco 49ers signed Wilkins to a 5-year, $20 million contract. After recording 30 tackles and a sack over two years in San Francisco and being injured late in his career, Wilkins retired after the 1999 season.

Post-career life
Wilkins now lives in Spartanburg, South Carolina, with his wife and four daughters.

References

1971 births
Living people
Sportspeople from Spartanburg, South Carolina
American football defensive ends
Gardner–Webb Runnin' Bulldogs football players
Green Bay Packers players
San Francisco 49ers players
People from Spartanburg County, South Carolina